Sir Donald Norman McKay  (28 November 1908 – 30 March 1988) was a New Zealand politician of the National Party. He was Minister of Health and Minister of Social Security in the Second National Government.

Biography

Early life and career
McKay was born in 1908 in Waipu. He received his education from Whangarei Boys' High School and the University of Auckland. At Whangarei Boys' High School he was head prefect, captain of the first XI cricket team and captain of the first XV rugby team. Another student at the same school was future parliamentary colleague Jack Marshall who described McKay as his schoolboy hero. He then became a farmer in Waipu. He married Miriam Hilda Stehr in 1934 with whom he had 3 children.

Member of Parliament

McKay joined the National Party and became the chairman of the Marsden electorate committee. In early 1954 the 77 year-old MP for Marsden Alfred Murdoch was challenged for the National nomination by William Rodney Lewin Vallance, the deputy mayor of Whangarei. Vallance won a postal ballot of members, an outcome which split the Marsden National Party membership into two opposing factions. After it emerged that Vallance was in trouble with his taxes he was in turn deselected and replaced by McKay. Vallance ran as an independent candidate and split the vote, almost costing National the seat.

He represented the Marsden electorate in the Northland region from 1954, and he retired in 1972. He was Minister of Health and Minister of Social Security in the Second National Government from 1962 to 1972 under Keith Holyoake.

Following National's victory in 1960, Deputy Prime Minister Jack Marshall was unable to convince Keith Holyoake to include McKay in the cabinet. Holyoake thought that McKay had not sufficiently proved himself in the house, but later appointed him following a midterm vacancy based on Marshall's endorsement.

Later life and death
After retiring from Parliament, he was elected a member of the Northland Harbour Board and served one term as its chairman.

McKay was appointed a Knight Commander of the Order of St Michael and St George, for public services, in the 1978 Queen's Birthday Honours, and died in 1988.

Notes

References

|-

New Zealand National Party MPs
Members of the Cabinet of New Zealand
1908 births
1988 deaths
Members of the New Zealand House of Representatives
New Zealand MPs for North Island electorates
University of Auckland alumni
People educated at Whangarei Boys' High School
New Zealand Knights Commander of the Order of St Michael and St George
20th-century New Zealand politicians
People from Waipu
Members of New Zealand harbour boards